Ballarat Energy Storage System (BESS) is a grid-connected energy storage system connected to the Ballarat Area Terminal Substation in Warrenheip, on the eastern outskirts of Ballarat in Victoria. It was commissioned in 2018 and provides 30 MWh of storage capacity at 30 MW. The battery was developed by NuvoGroup (owned by Spotless). Fluence provided the batteries, AusNet Services owns the facility, which is operated by EnergyAustralia. Funding was provided by AusNet Services and Australian Renewable Energy Agency (ARENA).

The system consists of nine units each of which contains Lithium-ion batteries along with cooling and safety systems.

References

Energy storage projects
Buildings and structures in Ballarat
Energy in Victoria (Australia)
Energy infrastructure completed in 2018
2018 establishments in Australia